Universitatea CSM Oradea, commonly known as U CSM Oradea, is a Romanian women's basketball club based in Oradea, currently participates in the Liga Națională, the top-tier league in Romania.

The club played in the last years in the second-tier Liga I. However, in 2018 the league was merged with the top-tier Liga Națională.

U CSM Oradea is the women's basketball section of both CSM Oradea and CSU Oradea, after a partnership signed between CSM, the municipality of Oradea sports club and CSU, University of Oradea sports club.

Current roster

References

External links
 CSU Oradea official website
 CSM Oradea official website
 Universitatea CSM Oradea. at totalbaschet.ro

Basketball teams in Romania
Women's basketball teams in Romania
Basketball teams established in 2004
2004 establishments in Romania